Elias Tamburini (born 1 February 1995) is a Finnish footballer.

References

1995 births
Sportspeople from Meurthe-et-Moselle
Footballers from Grand Est
Living people
Finnish footballers
Association football defenders
Helsingin Jalkapalloklubi players
Klubi 04 players
US Hostert players
Grindavík men's football players
Íþróttabandalag Akraness players
1. FC Phönix Lübeck players
Kakkonen players
Úrvalsdeild karla (football) players
Regionalliga players
Finnish expatriate footballers
Expatriate footballers in Luxembourg
Finnish expatriate sportspeople in Luxembourg
Expatriate soccer players in the United States
Finnish expatriate sportspeople in the United States
Expatriate footballers in Iceland
Finnish expatriate sportspeople in Iceland
Expatriate footballers in Germany
Finnish expatriate sportspeople in Germany